At the beginning of the War of the Fifth Coalition on 9 April 1809, the armies of the Austrian Empire invaded the Kingdom of Bavaria, an ally of the First French Empire, and the Kingdom of Italy, a French satellite. After Austria's defeat in the War of the Third Coalition the County of Tyrol and the Vorarlberg were ceded to Bavaria in the Fourth Peace of Pressburg on 26 December 1805. Angry at the imposition of Bavarian laws and conscription, the Tyrolese rebelled in support of Austria. During the first week, local irregular forces killed or captured the main Bavarian garrison and also forced a French force to capitulate.

To assist the Tyrolean Rebellion, the Austrian high command sent a regular division into the Tyrol under the leadership of Feldmarschallleutnant Johann Gabriel Chasteler de Courcelles. The VII Corps, consisting of three Bavarian divisions under the overall command of Marshal François Joseph Lefebvre, invaded the Tyrol in mid-May. On 11 May, Lieutenant General Bernhard Erasmus von Deroy relieved the besieged Kufstein Fortress. Lieutenant General Karl Philipp von Wrede crushed Chasteler's division on 13 May at the Battle of Wörgl. Soon afterward, Lefebvre occupied Innsbruck. However, Deroy's division was attacked on 25 May and 29 May in the first two Battles of Bergisel and compelled to evacuate the Tyrol. By this time Chasteler's surviving regular troops were recalled to join the Army of Inner Austria, which was retreating toward Hungary. Only a handful of regulars were left to operate in the Tyrol.

Soon after Emperor Napoleon I of France defeated the main Austrian army at the Battle of Wagram on 5 and 6 July, Austria sued for peace. However, the revolt in the Tyrol continued and the Bavarians invaded the region a second time in late July. After the insurgents beat Deroy at the Third Battle of Bergisel on 13 August, the Bavarians again withdrew. In the third invasion, the Bavarian 1st Division under General-Major Rechberg inflicted a bloody defeat on the irregulars on 17 October. Wrede won the Fourth Battle of Bergisel on 1 November and the revolt finally died down. One of the leaders of the rebellion, Andreas Hofer was betrayed to the French and executed in February 1810.

Order of battle

Austrian Tyrol force
Chastler's original force was organized as follows. 

 Tyrol Detachment: Feldmarschallleutnant Johann Gabriel Chasteler de Courcelles
 1st Brigade: General-Major Ignaz Peter Marchal
 Hohenlohe-Bartenstein Infantry Regiment # 26 (3 battalions)
 Lusignan Infantry Regiment # 16 (3 battalions)
 Hohenzollern Chevau-léger Regiment # 2 (3 squadrons)
 2nd Brigade: General-Major Franz Fenner
 Jäger battalion # 9
 Villach, Klagenfurt, and Bruck Landwehr battalions
 Artillery:
 One 3-pdr brigade battery (8 guns)
 One 6-pdr position battery (6 guns)
 One-half horse battery (3 guns)

Bavarian forces
Returns from 16 April

VII Corps: Marshal François Joseph Lefebvre 
 Artillery Reserve: Colonel Calonge
 Three 12-pdr position batteries (18 guns)
 1st Bavarian Division: Lieutenant-General Crown Prince Ludwig of Bavaria
 Brigade: General-Major Rechberg
 1st Habermann Light battalion
 Leib Regiment (2 battalions)
 2nd Prince Royal Regiment (2 battalions)
 Brigade: General-Major Stengel
 4th Salern Regiment (2 battalions)
 8th Duc Pius Regiment (2 battalions)
 Cavalry Brigade: General-Major Zandt
 Minuzzi Dragoon Regiment (2 squadrons)
 Prince Royal Chevau-léger Regiment (4 squadrons)
 Artillery: Two 6-pdr foot batteries, 6-pdr horse battery (18 guns)

 2nd Bavarian Division: Lieutenant-General Karl Philipp von Wrede
 Brigade: General-Major Minuzzi
 6th Laroche Light battalion
 3rd Prince Karl Regiment (2 battalions)
 13th Regiment (2 battalions)
 Brigade: General-Major Beckers
 6th Duc Wilhelm Regiment (2 battalions)
 7th Löwenstein Regiment (2 battalions)
 Cavalry Brigade: General-Major Preysing
 König Chevau-léger Regiment (4 squadrons)
 Leiningen Chevau-léger Regiment (4 squadrons)
 Artillery: Two 6-pdr foot batteries, 6-pdr horse battery (18 guns)

 3rd Bavarian Division: Lieutenant-General Bernhard Erasmus von Deroy
 Brigade: General-Major Siebein
 5th Buttler Light battalion
 9th Isenburg Regiment (2 battalions)
 10th Juncker Regiment (2 battalions)
 Brigade: General-Major Vincenti
 7th Günter Light battalion
 5th Regiment (2 battalions)
 14th Preysing Regiment (2 battalions)
 Cavalry Brigade: General-Major Seydewitz
 Taxis Dragoon Regiment (4 squadrons)
 Bubenhoven Chevau-léger Regiment (4 squadrons)
 Artillery: Two 6-pdr foot batteries, 6-pdr horse battery (18 guns)

Notes

References
 Bowden, Scotty & Tarbox, Charlie. Armies on the Danube 1809. Arlington, Texas: Empire Games Press, 1980.
 Schneid, Frederick C. Napoleon's Italian Campaigns: 1805-1815. Westport, Conn.: Praeger Publishers, 2002.

Further reading
 Arnold, James R. Crisis on the Danube. New York: Paragon House, 1990. 
 Arnold, James R. Napoleon Conquers Austria. Westport, Conn.: Praeger Publishers, 1995. 
 Epstein, Robert M. Napoleon's Last Victory and the Emergence of Modern War. Lawrence, Kansas: University Press of Kansas, 1994.
 Petre, F. Loraine. Napoleon and the Archduke Charles. New York: Hippocrene Books, (1909) 1976.
 Smith, Digby. The Napoleonic Wars Data Book. London: Greenhill, 1998. 

Napoleonic Wars orders of battle
Battles of the War of the Fifth Coalition